The Chinese Elm cultivar Ulmus parvifolia 'Hokkaido' is an older cultivar of Japanese origin.

Description
A dwarf variety, it has been considered "too small for common size bonsai".

Cultivation
'Hokkaido' is relatively common in commercial cultivation on both sides of the Atlantic.

Synonymy
 'Microphylla': Anon.
 Ulmus parvifolia 'Pygmaea', name in synonymy

Accessions

North America

Denver Botanic Gardens, US. No details available.
Holden Arboretum, US. Acc. no. L-98-506
New York Botanical Garden, US. Acc. no. 1385/96

Europe

Cambridge Botanic Garden , University of Cambridge, UK. No details available.
National Botanic Gardens , Glasnevin, Dublin, Ireland. Location AY
Royal Botanic Garden Edinburgh, UK. Acc. no. 19772625
Royal Botanic Gardens Kew, UK. (as cv. 'Pygmaea'). Acc. nos. 1983-5054, 1984-3631
Royal Horticultural Society Gardens, Wisley, UK. No details available.
Sir Harold Hillier Gardens, Ampfield, Hampshire, UK. Acc. no. 2005.0996
Hortus Botanicus Amsterdam, Amsterdam, Netherlands. Acc. no. 850208

Nurseries

North America

ForestFarm , Williams, Oregon, US.
North American Plants , Lafayette, Oregon, US.

Europe

(Widely available)

References

Chinese elm cultivar
Ulmus articles missing images
Ulmus